Inachus dorsettensis, commonly known as the scorpion spider crab, is a species of crab generally found on loose substrates (stony bottoms to mud) from  depth down to about . It is found along the east coast of the Atlantic Ocean from Norway to South Africa, and also in the Mediterranean Sea.

Description
They are usually seen covered with sponge which they apply themselves. I. dorsettensis resembles the closely related species Inachus phalangium, but has more prominent spines on the carapace. They molt, with the intermolting period being shorter the warmer the water they reside in is.

References

Majoidea
Crabs of the Atlantic Ocean
Crustaceans described in 1777
Taxa named by Thomas Pennant